Wonder (stylized in all uppercase) is Japanese voice actor Mamoru Miyano's second studio album. It was released on August 4, 2010 by King Records. Two singles were released to promote the album, "JS" and "Refrain".

Album information
The album was released in two formats; the regular CD format and a CD+DVD format. The latter contained the promotional videos of "JS", "Refrain", and the album's opening track "Wonder Love", as well as the making of "Wonder Love".

Singles
The first single released was "JS" (stylized as "J☆S"), on July 29, 2009. The single peaked at No. 22 on the Oricon single charts and charted for two weeks.

Track listing

Source:

References

2010 albums
Mamoru Miyano albums
King Records (Japan) albums